The Permian–Triassic (P–T, P–Tr) extinction event, also known as the End-Permian extinction event and colloquially as the Great Dying, forms the boundary between the Permian and Triassic geologic periods, and with them the Paleozoic and Mesozoic eras respectively, approximately 251.9 million years ago. As the largest of the "Big Five" mass extinctions of the Phanerozoic, it is the Earth's most severe known extinction event, with the extinction of 57% of biological families, 83% of genera, 81% of marine species and 70% of terrestrial vertebrate species. It is the largest known mass extinction of insects. There is evidence for one to three distinct pulses, or phases, of extinction.

The scientific consensus is that the main cause of extinction was the large amount of carbon dioxide emitted by the volcanic eruptions that created the Siberian Traps, which elevated global temperatures, and in the oceans led to widespread anoxia and acidification. Proposed contributing factors include: the emission of much additional carbon dioxide from the thermal decomposition of hydrocarbon deposits, including oil and coal, triggered by the eruptions; and emissions of methane by novel methanogenic microorganisms, perhaps nourished by minerals dispersed in the eruptions.

The speed of recovery from the extinction is disputed. Some scientists estimate that it took 10 million years (until the Middle Triassic), due both to the severity of the extinction and because grim conditions returned periodically over the course of the Early Triassic, causing further extinction events, such as the Smithian-Spathian boundary extinction. However, studies in Bear Lake County, near Paris, Idaho, and nearby sites in Idaho and Nevada showed a relatively quick rebound in a localized Early Triassic marine ecosystem, taking around 3 million years to recover, while an unusually diverse and complex ichnobiota is known from Italy less than a million years after the end-Permian extinction. Additionally, the complex Guiyang biota found near Guiyang, China also indicates life thrived in some places just a million years after the mass extinction. Regional differences in the pace of biotic recovery suggest that the impact of the extinction may have been felt less severely in some areas than others, with differential environmental stress and instability.

Dating 

Previously, it was thought that rock sequences spanning the Permian–Triassic boundary were too few and contained too many gaps for scientists to reliably determine its details. However, it is now possible to date the extinction with millennial precision. U–Pb zircon dates from five volcanic ash beds from the Global Stratotype Section and Point for the Permian–Triassic boundary at Meishan, China, establish a high-resolution age model for the extinction – allowing exploration of the links between global environmental perturbation, carbon cycle disruption, mass extinction, and recovery at millennial timescales.

A large (approximately 0.9%), abrupt global decrease in the ratio of the stable isotope carbon-13 to that of carbon-12 coincides with this extinction, and is sometimes used to identify the Permian–Triassic boundary in rocks that are unsuitable for radiometric dating.

There is also evidence of increased ultraviolet radiation reaching the earth, causing the mutation of plant spores.

It has been suggested that the Permian–Triassic boundary is associated with a sharp increase in the abundance of marine and terrestrial fungi, caused by the sharp increase in the amount of dead plants and animals fed upon by the fungi. For a while this "fungal spike" was used by some paleontologists to identify the Permian–Triassic boundary in rocks that are unsuitable for radiometric dating or have a lack of suitable index fossils, but even the proposers of the fungal spike hypothesis pointed out that "fungal spikes" may have been a repeating phenomenon created by the post-extinction ecosystem during the earliest Triassic. The very idea of a fungal spike has been criticized on several grounds, including: Reduviasporonites, the most common supposed fungal spore, may be a fossilized alga; the spike did not appear worldwide; and in many places it did not fall on the Permian–Triassic boundary. The Reduviasporonites may even represent a transition to a lake-dominated Triassic world rather than an earliest Triassic zone of death and decay in some terrestrial fossil beds. Newer chemical evidence agrees better with a fungal origin for Reduviasporonites, diluting these critiques.

Uncertainty exists regarding the duration of the overall extinction and about the timing and duration of various groups' extinctions within the greater process. Some evidence suggests that there were multiple extinction pulses or that the extinction was long and spread out over a few million years, with a sharp peak in the last million years of the Permian. Statistical analyses of some highly fossiliferous strata in Meishan, Zhejiang Province in southeastern China, suggest that the main extinction was clustered around one peak. Recent research shows that different groups became extinct at different times; for example, while difficult to date absolutely, ostracod and brachiopod extinctions were separated by around 670,000 to 1.17 million years. Palaeoenvironmental analysis of Lopingian strata in the Bowen Basin of Queensland indicates numerous intermittent periods of marine environmental stress from the middle to late Lopingian leading up to the end-Permian extinction proper, supporting aspects of the gradualist hypothesis. Additionally, the decline in marine species richness and the structural collapse of marine ecosystems may have been decoupled as well, with the former preceding the latter by about 61,000 years according to one study.

Whether the terrestrial and marine extinctions were synchronous or asynchronous is another point of controversy. Evidence from a well-preserved sequence in east Greenland suggests that the terrestrial and marine extinctions began simultaneously. In this sequence, the decline of animal life is concentrated in a period approximately 10,000 to 60,000 years long, with plants taking an additional several hundred thousand years to show the full impact of the event. Other scientists believe the terrestrial mass extinction began between 60 and 370 thousand years before the onset of the marine mass extinction.

An older theory, still supported in some recent papers, is that there were two major extinction pulses 9.4 million years apart, separated by a period of extinctions well above the background level, and that the final extinction killed off only about 80% of marine species alive at that time while the other losses occurred during the first pulse or the interval between pulses. According to this theory one of these extinction pulses occurred at the end of the Guadalupian epoch of the Permian. For example, all dinocephalian genera died out at the end of the Guadalupian, as did the Verbeekinidae, a family of large-size fusuline foraminifera. The impact of the end-Guadalupian extinction on marine organisms appears to have varied between locations and between taxonomic groups – brachiopods and corals had severe losses.

Studies of the timing and causes of the Permian-Triassic extinction are complicated by the often-overlooked Capitanian extinction (also called the Guadalupian extinction), just one of perhaps two mass extinctions in the late Permian that closely preceded the Permian-Triassic event. In short, when the Permian-Triassic starts it is difficult to know whether the end-Capitanian had finished, depending on the factor considered. Some of the extinctions dated to the Permian-Triassic boundary have recently been redated to the end-Capitanian. Further, it is unclear whether some species who survived the prior extinction(s) had recovered well enough for their final demise in the Permian-Triassic event to be considered separate from Capitanian event. A minority point of view considers the sequence of environmental disasters to have effectively constituted a single, prolonged extinction event, perhaps depending on which species is considered.

Extinction patterns

Marine organisms 
Marine invertebrates suffered the greatest losses during the P–Tr extinction. Evidence of this was found in samples from south China sections at the P–Tr boundary. Here, 286 out of 329 marine invertebrate genera disappear within the final two sedimentary zones containing conodonts from the Permian. The decrease in diversity was probably caused by a sharp increase in extinctions, rather than a decrease in speciation.

The extinction primarily affected organisms with calcium carbonate skeletons, especially those reliant on stable CO2 levels to produce their skeletons. These organisms were susceptible to the effects of the ocean acidification that resulted from increased atmospheric CO2. There is also evidence that endemism was a strong risk factor influencing a taxon's likelihood of extinction. Bivalve taxa that were endemic and localised to a specific region were more likely to go extinct than cosmopolitan taxa. 

Among benthic organisms the extinction event multiplied background extinction rates, and therefore caused maximum species loss to taxa that had a high background extinction rate (by implication, taxa with a high turnover). The extinction rate of marine organisms was catastrophic. Bioturbators were extremely severely affected, as evidenced by the loss of the sedimentary mixed layer in many marine facies during the end-Permian extinction.

Surviving marine invertebrate groups included articulate brachiopods (those with a hinge), which had undergone a slow decline in numbers since the P–Tr extinction; the Ceratitida order of ammonites; and crinoids ("sea lilies"), which very nearly became extinct but later became abundant and diverse. The groups with the highest survival rates generally had active control of circulation, elaborate gas exchange mechanisms, and light calcification; more heavily calcified organisms with simpler breathing apparatuses suffered the greatest loss of species diversity. In the case of the brachiopods, at least, surviving taxa were generally small, rare members of a formerly diverse community.

The ammonoids, which had been in a long-term decline for the 30 million years since the Roadian (middle Permian), suffered a selective extinction pulse 10 million years before the main event, at the end of the Capitanian stage. In this preliminary extinction, which greatly reduced disparity, or the range of different ecological guilds, environmental factors were apparently responsible. Diversity and disparity fell further until the P–Tr boundary; the extinction here (P–Tr) was non-selective, consistent with a catastrophic initiator. During the Triassic, diversity rose rapidly, but disparity remained low. The range of morphospace occupied by the ammonoids, that is, their range of possible forms, shapes or structures, became more restricted as the Permian progressed. A few million years into the Triassic, the original range of ammonoid structures was once again reoccupied, but the parameters were now shared differently among clades.

The Lilliput effect, a term used to describe the phenomenon of dwarfing of species during and immediately following a mass extinction event, has been observed across the Permian-Triassic boundary, notably occurring in foraminifera, brachiopods, bivalves, and ostracods. It remains debated whether the Lilliput effect took hold among gastropods. Some gastropod taxa, termed “Gulliver gastropods”, ballooned in size during and immediately following the mass extinction, exemplifying the Lilliput effect’s opposite, which has been dubbed the Brobdingnag effect.

Terrestrial invertebrates 
The Permian had great diversity in insect and other invertebrate species, including the largest insects ever to have existed. The end-Permian is the largest known mass extinction of insects; according to some sources, it may well be the only mass extinction to significantly affect insect diversity. Eight or nine insect orders became extinct and ten more were greatly reduced in diversity. Palaeodictyopteroids (insects with piercing and sucking mouthparts) began to decline during the mid-Permian; these extinctions have been linked to a change in flora. The greatest decline occurred in the Late Permian and was probably not directly caused by weather-related floral transitions.

Terrestrial plants 
The geological record of terrestrial plants is sparse and based mostly on pollen and spore studies. Plants are relatively immune to mass extinction, with the impact of all the major mass extinctions "insignificant" at a family level. Even the reduction observed in species diversity (of 50%) may be mostly due to taphonomic processes. However, a massive rearrangement of ecosystems does occur, with plant abundances and distributions changing profoundly and all the forests virtually disappearing. The dominant floral groups changed, with many groups of land plants entering abrupt decline, such as Cordaites (gymnosperms) and Glossopteris (seed ferns); the Palaeozoic flora scarcely survived this extinction.

The Glossopteris-dominated flora that characterised high-latitude Gondwana collapsed in Australia around 370,000 years before the Permian-Triassic boundary, with this flora's collapse being less constrained in western Gondwana but still likely occurring a few hundred thousand years before the boundary.

Palynological or pollen studies from East Greenland of sedimentary rock strata laid down during the extinction period indicate dense gymnosperm woodlands before the event. At the same time that marine invertebrate macrofauna declined, these large woodlands died out and were followed by a rise in diversity of smaller herbaceous plants including Lycopodiophyta, both Selaginellales and Isoetales.

The Cordaites flora, which dominated the Angaran floristic realm corresponding to Siberia, collapsed over the course of the extinction. In the Kuznetsk Basin, the aridity-induced extinction of the regions's humid-adapted forest flora dominated by cordaitaleans occurred approximately 252.76 Ma, around 820,000 years before the end-Permian extinction in South China, suggesting that the end-Permian biotic catastrophe may have started earlier on land and that the ecological crisis may have been more gradual and asynchronous on land compared to its more abrupt onset in the marine realm.

In South China, the subtropical Cathaysian gigantopterid dominated rainforests abruptly collapsed. The floral extinction in South China is associated with bacterial blooms in soil and nearby lacustrine ecosystems, with soil erosion resulting from the die-off of plants being their likely cause.

Terrestrial vertebrates 
There is enough evidence to indicate that over two thirds of terrestrial labyrinthodont amphibians, sauropsid ("reptile") and therapsid ("proto-mammal") taxa became extinct. Large herbivores suffered the heaviest losses.

All Permian anapsid reptiles died out except the procolophonids (although testudines have morphologically-anapsid skulls, they are now thought to have separately evolved from diapsid ancestors). Pelycosaurs died out before the end of the Permian. Too few Permian diapsid fossils have been found to support any conclusion about the effect of the Permian extinction on diapsids (the "reptile" group from which lizards, snakes, crocodilians, and dinosaurs (including birds) evolved).

The groups that survived suffered extremely heavy losses of species and some terrestrial vertebrate groups very nearly became extinct at the end of the Permian. Some of the surviving groups did not persist for long past this period, but others that barely survived went on to produce diverse and long-lasting lineages. However, it took 30million years for the terrestrial vertebrate fauna to fully recover both numerically and ecologically.

It is difficult to analyze extinction and survival rates of land organisms in detail because few terrestrial fossil beds span the Permian–Triassic boundary. The best-known record of vertebrate changes across the Permian–Triassic boundary occurs in the Karoo Supergroup of South Africa, but statistical analyses have so far not produced clear conclusions.

Biotic recovery 

In the wake of the extinction event, the ecological structure of present-day biosphere evolved from the stock of surviving taxa. In the sea, the "Modern Evolutionary Fauna" became dominant over elements of the "Palaeozoic Evolutionary Fauna". Typical taxa of shelly benthic faunas were now bivalves, snails, sea urchins and Malacostraca, whereas bony fishes and marine reptiles diversified in the pelagic zone. On land, dinosaurs and mammals arose in the course of the Triassic. The profound change in the taxonomic composition was partly a result of the selectivity of the extinction event, which affected some taxa (e.g., brachiopods) more severely than others (e.g., bivalves). However, recovery was also differential between taxa. Some survivors became extinct some million years after the extinction event without having rediversified (dead clade walking, e.g. the snail family Bellerophontidae), whereas others rose to dominance over geologic times (e.g., bivalves).

Marine ecosystems 

Marine post-extinction faunas were mostly species-poor and dominated by few disaster species such as the bivalves Claraia and Unionites. Seafloor communities maintained a comparatively low diversity until the end of the Early Triassic, approximately 4 million years after the extinction event. This slow recovery stands in remarkable contrast with the quick recovery seen in nektonic organisms such as ammonoids, which exceeded pre-extinction diversities already two million years after the crisis. The relative delay in the recovery of benthic organisms has been attributed to widespread anoxia, but high abundances of benthic species contradict this explanation. More recent work suggests that the pace of recovery was intrinsically driven by the intensity of competition among species, which drives rates of niche differentiation and speciation. Accordingly, low levels of interspecific competition in seafloor communities that are dominated by primary consumers correspond to slow rates of diversification and high levels of interspecific competition among nektonic secondary and tertiary consumers to high diversification rates. Other studies point to the recurrent episodes of extremely hot climatic conditions during the Early Triassic for the delayed recovery of oceanic life. A 2019 study attributed the dissimilarity of recovery times between different ecological communities to differences in local environmental stress during the biotic recovery interval, with regions experiencing persistent environmental stress post-extinction recovering more slowly. Early Triassic environmental stresses also acted as a ceiling limiting the maximum ecological complexity of marine ecosystems until the Spathian. Whereas most marine communities were fully recovered by the Middle Triassic, global marine diversity reached pre-extinction values no earlier than the Middle Jurassic, approximately 75 million years after the extinction event.

Prior to the extinction, about two-thirds of marine animals were sessile and attached to the seafloor. During the Mesozoic, only about half of the marine animals were sessile while the rest were free-living. Analysis of marine fossils from the period indicated a decrease in the abundance of sessile epifaunal suspension feeders such as brachiopods and sea lilies and an increase in more complex mobile species such as snails, sea urchins and crabs.

Before the Permian mass extinction event, both complex and simple marine ecosystems were equally common. After the recovery from the mass extinction, the complex communities outnumbered the simple communities by nearly three to one, and the increase in predation pressure led to the Mesozoic Marine Revolution.

Bivalves were fairly rare before the P–Tr extinction but became numerous and diverse in the Triassic, taking over niches that were filled primarily by brachiopods before the mass extinction event, and one group, the rudist clams, became the Mesozoic's main reef-builders. Some researchers think the change was attributable not only to the end-Permian extinction but also the ecological restructuring that began as a result of the Capitanian extinction.

Linguliform brachiopods were commonplace immediately after the extinction event, their abundance having been essentially unaffected by the crisis. Adaptations for oxygen-poor and warm environments, such as increased lophophoral cavity surface, shell width/length ratio, and shell miniaturisation, are observed in post-extinction linguliforms.

Crinoids ("sea lilies") suffered a selective extinction, resulting in a decrease in the variety of their forms. Their ensuing adaptive radiation was brisk, and resulted in forms possessing flexible arms becoming widespread; motility, predominantly a response to predation pressure, also became far more prevalent.

Microbial-metazoan reefs dominated surviving communities in the immediate wake of the mass extinction. Metazoan-built reefs reemerged during the Olenekian, mainly being composed of sponge biostrome and bivalve builups. "Tubiphytes"-dominated reefs appeared at the end of the Olenekian, representing the earliest platform-margin reefs of the Triassic, though they did not become abundant until the late Anisian, when reefs' species richness increased. The first scleractinian corals appear in the late Anisian as well, although they would not become the dominant reef builders until the end of the Triassic period. Metazoan reefs became common again during the Anisian because the oceans cooled down then from their overheated state during the Early Triassic.

Ichnocoenoses show that marine ecosystems recovered to pre-extinction levels of ecological complexity by the late Olenekian. Anisian ichnocoenoses show slightly lower diversity than Spathian ichnocoenoses, although this was likely a taphonomic consequence of increased and deeper bioturbation erasing evidence of shallower bioturbation.

Ichnological evidence suggests that recovery and recolonisation of marine environments may have taken place by way of outward dispersal from refugia that suffered relatively mild perturbations and whose local biotas were less strongly affected by the mass extinction compared to the rest of the world’s oceans. Wave-dominated shoreface settings (WDSS) are believed to have served as refugium environments because they appear to have been unusually diverse in the mass extinction’s aftermath.

Terrestrial plants 
The proto-recovery of terrestrial floras took place from a few tens of thousands of years after the end-Permian extinction to around 350,000 years after it, with the exact timeline varying by region. Dominant gymnosperm genera were replaced post-boundary by lycophytesextant lycophytes are recolonizers of disturbed areas. The particular post-extinction dominance of lycophytes, which were well adapted for coastal environments, can be explained in part by global marine transgressions during the Early Triassic. The worldwide recovery of gymnosperm forests took approximately 4–5 million years. However, this trend of prolonged lycophyte dominance during the Early Triassic was not universal, as evidenced by the much more rapid recovery of gymnosperms in certain regions, and floral recovery likely didn't follow a congruent, globally universal trend but instead varied by region according to local environmental conditions.

In East Greenland, lycophytes replaced gymnosperms as the dominant plants. Later, other groups of gymnosperms again become dominant but again suffered major die-offs. These cyclical flora shifts occurred a few times over the course of the extinction period and afterward. These fluctuations of the dominant flora between woody and herbaceous taxa indicate chronic environmental stress resulting in a loss of most large woodland plant species. The successions and extinctions of plant communities do not coincide with the shift in  values but occurred many years after.

In what is now the Barents Sea of the coast of Norway, the post-extinction fauna is dominated by pteridophytes and lycopods, which were suited for primary succession and recolonisation of devastated areas, although gymnosperms made a rapid recovery, with the lycopod dominated flora not persisting across most of the Early Triassic as postulated in other regions.

In Europe and North China, the interval of recovery was dominated by the lycopsid Pleuromeia, an opportunistic pioneer plant that filled ecological vacancies until other plants were able to expand out of refugia and recolonise the land. Conifers became common by the early Anisian, while pteridosperms and cycadophytes only fully recovered by the late Anisian. 

In southwestern Gondwana, the post-extinction flora was dominated by bennettitaleans and cycads, with memers of Peltaspermales, Ginkgoales, and Umkomasiales being less common constituents of this flora. Around the Induan-Olenekian boundary, as palaeocommunities recovered, a new Dicroidium flora was established, in which Umkomasiales continued to be prominent and in which Equisetales and Cycadales were subordinate forms. The Dicroidium flora further diversified in the Anisian to its peak, wherein Umkomasiales and Ginkgoales constituted most of the tree canopy and  Peltaspermales, Petriellales, Cycadales, Umkomasiales, Gnetales, Equisetales, and Dipteridaceae dominated the understory.

The gigantopterid-dominated forests of South China were replaced by low-lying herbaceous vegetation dominated by the isoetalean Tomiostrobus following the collapse of the former. In contrast to the highly biodiverse gigantopterid rainforests, the post-extinction landscape of South China was near-barren and had vastly lower diversity.

Coal gap 
No coal deposits are known from the Early Triassic, and those in the Middle Triassic are thin and low-grade. This "coal gap" has been explained in many ways. It has been suggested that new, more aggressive fungi, insects, and vertebrates evolved and killed vast numbers of trees. These decomposers themselves suffered heavy losses of species during the extinction and are not considered a likely cause of the coal gap. It could simply be that all coal-forming plants were rendered extinct by the P–Tr extinction and that it took 10 million years for a new suite of plants to adapt to the moist, acid conditions of peat bogs. Abiotic factors (factors not caused by organisms), such as decreased rainfall or increased input of clastic sediments, may also be to blame.

On the other hand, the lack of coal may simply reflect the scarcity of all known sediments from the Early Triassic. Coal-producing ecosystems, rather than disappearing, may have moved to areas where we have no sedimentary record for the Early Triassic. For example, in eastern Australia a cold climate had been the norm for a long period, with a peat mire ecosystem adapted to these conditions. Approximately 95% of these peat-producing plants went locally extinct at the P–Tr boundary; coal deposits in Australia and Antarctica disappear significantly before the P–Tr boundary.

Terrestrial vertebrates 

Lystrosaurus, a pig-sized herbivorous dicynodont therapsid, constituted as much as 90% of some earliest Triassic land vertebrate fauna. Smaller carnivorous cynodont therapsids also survived, including the ancestors of mammals. In the Karoo region of southern Africa, the therocephalians Tetracynodon, Moschorhinus and Ictidosuchoides survived, but do not appear to have been abundant in the Triassic. In North China, tetrapod body and ichnofossils are extremely rare in Induan facies, but become more abundant in the Olenekian and Anisian, showing a biotic recovery of tetrapods synchronous with the decreasing aridity during the Olenekian and Anisian.

Archosaurs (which included the ancestors of dinosaurs and crocodilians) were initially rarer than therapsids, but they began to displace therapsids in the mid-Triassic. In the mid to late Triassic, the dinosaurs evolved from one group of archosaurs, and went on to dominate terrestrial ecosystems during the Jurassic and Cretaceous. This "Triassic Takeover" may have contributed to the evolution of mammals by forcing the surviving therapsids and their mammaliform successors to live as small, mainly nocturnal insectivores; nocturnal life probably forced at least the mammaliforms to develop fur, better hearing and higher metabolic rates, while losing part of the differential color-sensitive retinal receptors reptilians and birds preserved. The archosaur dominance would end again due to the Cretaceous–Paleogene extinction event, after which both birds (only extant dinosaurs) and mammals (only extant synapsids)  would diversify and share the world.

Some temnospondyl amphibians made a relatively quick recovery, in spite of nearly becoming extinct. Mastodonsaurus and trematosaurians were the main aquatic and semiaquatic predators during most of the Triassic, some preying on tetrapods and others on fish.

Land vertebrates took an unusually long time to recover from the P–Tr extinction; Palaeontologist Michael Benton estimated the recovery was not complete until  after the extinction, i.e. not until the Late Triassic, when the first dinosaurs had risen from bipedal archosaurian ancestors and the first mammals from small cynodont ancestors.

Coprolitic evidence indicates that freshwater food webs had recovered by the early Ladinian, with a lacustrine coprolite assemblage from the Ordos Basin of China providing evidence of a trophically multileveled ecosystem containing at least six different trophic levels. The highest trophic levels were filled by vertebrate predators.

Terrestrial invertebrates 
Most fossil insect groups found after the Permian–Triassic boundary differ significantly from those before: Of Paleozoic insect groups, only the Glosselytrodea, Miomoptera, and Protorthoptera have been discovered in deposits from after the extinction. The caloneurodeans, monurans, paleodictyopteroids, protelytropterans, and protodonates became extinct by the end of the Permian. Though Triassic insects are very different from those of the Permian, a gap in the insect fossil record spans approximately 15 million years from the late Permian to early Triassic. In well-documented Late Triassic deposits, fossils overwhelmingly consist of modern fossil insect groups.

Hypotheses about cause 

Pinpointing the exact causes of the Permian–Triassic extinction event is difficult, mostly because it occurred over 250 million years ago, and since then much of the evidence that would have pointed to the cause has been destroyed or is concealed deep within the Earth under many layers of rock. The sea floor is completely recycled over around 200 million years by the ongoing process of plate tectonics and seafloor spreading, leaving no useful indications beneath the ocean.

Yet, scientists have gathered significant evidence for causes, and several mechanisms have been proposed. The proposals include both catastrophic and gradual processes (similar to those theorized for the Cretaceous–Paleogene extinction event).
The catastrophic group includes one or more large bolide impact events, increased volcanism, and sudden release of methane from the seafloor, either due to dissociation of methane hydrate deposits or metabolism of organic carbon deposits by methanogenic microbes.
The gradual group includes sea level change, increasing hypoxia, and increasing aridity.

Any hypothesis about the cause must explain the selectivity of the event, which affected organisms with calcium carbonate skeletons most severely; the long period (4 to 6 million years) before recovery started, and the minimal extent of biological mineralization (despite inorganic carbonates being deposited) once the recovery began.

Volcanism

Siberian Traps
Such a vast aerial extent of the flood basalts may have contributed to their exceptionally catastrophic impact. The date of the Siberian Traps eruptions and the extinction event are in good agreement. The timeline of the extinction event strongly indicates it was caused by events in the large igneous province of the Siberian Traps. A study of the Norilsk and Maymecha-Kotuy regions of the northern Siberian platform indicates that volcanic activity occurred during a small number of high intensity pulses that exuded enormous volumes of magma, as opposed to flows emplaced at regular intervals. The rate of carbon dioxide release from the Siberian Traps represented one of the most rapid rises of carbon dioxide levels in the geologic record, with the rate of carbon dioxide emissions being estimated by one study to be five times faster than the rate during the already catastrophic Capitanian mass extinction event, which occurred as a result of the activity of the Emeishan Traps in southwestern China at the end of the Middle Permian. Carbon dioxide levels prior to and after the eruptions are poorly constrained, but may have jumped from between 500 and 4,000  prior to the extinction event to around 8,000  after the extinction. As carbon dioxide levels shot up, extreme temperature rise would have followed. In a 2020 paper, scientists reconstructed the mechanisms that led to the extinction event in a biogeochemical model, showed the consequences of the greenhouse effect on the marine environment, and concluded that the mass extinction can be traced back to volcanic CO emissions. Further evidence – based on paired coronene-mercury spikes – for a volcanic combustion cause of the mass extinction was published in 2020.

The Siberian Traps had unusual features that made them even more dangerous. The Siberian Traps eruptions released sulphur-rich volatiles that caused dust clouds and the formation of acid aerosols, which would have blocked out sunlight and thus disrupted photosynthesis both on land and in the photic zone of the ocean, causing food chains to collapse. These volcanic outbursts of sulphur also induced brief but severe global cooling that interrupted the broader trend of rapid global warming, leading to glacio-eustatic sea level fall. The eruptions may also have caused acid rain as the aerosols washed out of the atmosphere. That may have killed land plants and mollusks and planktonic organisms which had calcium carbonate shells. Pure flood basalts produce fluid, low-viscosity lava, and do not hurl debris into the atmosphere. It appears, however, that 20% of the output of the Siberian Traps eruptions was pyroclastic (consisted of ash and other debris thrown high into the atmosphere), increasing the short-term cooling effect. When all of the dust and ash clouds and aerosols washed out of the atmosphere, the excess carbon dioxide emitted by the Siberian Traps would have remained and global warming would have proceeded without any mitigating effects.

The Siberian Traps are underlain by thick sequences of Early-Mid Paleozoic aged carbonate and evaporite deposits, as well as Carboniferous-Permian aged coal bearing clastic rocks. When heated, such as by igneous intrusions, these rocks are capable of emitting large amounts of greenhouse and toxic gases. The unique setting of the Siberian Traps over these deposits is likely the reason for the severity of the extinction. The basalt lava erupted or intruded into carbonate rocks and into sediments that were in the process of forming large coal beds, both of which would have emitted large amounts of carbon dioxide, leading to stronger global warming after the dust and aerosols settled. The timing of the change of the Siberian Traps from flood basalt dominated emplacement to sill dominated emplacement, the latter of which would have liberated the largest amounts of trapped hydrocarbon deposits, coincides with the onset of the main phase of the mass extinction and is linked to a major negative  excursion. A 2011 study led by Stephen E. Grasby reported evidence that volcanism caused massive coal beds to ignite, possibly releasing more than 3 trillion tons of carbon. The team found ash deposits in deep rock layers near what is now the Buchanan Lake Formation. According to their article, "coal ash dispersed by the explosive Siberian Trap eruption would be expected to have an associated release of toxic elements in impacted water bodies where fly ash slurries developed. ... Mafic megascale eruptions are long-lived events that would allow significant build-up of global ash clouds." In a statement, Grasby said, "In addition to these volcanoes causing fires through coal, the ash it spewed was highly toxic and was released in the land and water, potentially contributing to the worst extinction event in earth history." A 2013 study led by Q.Y. Yang reported that the total amounts of important volatiles emitted from the Siberian Traps consisted of 8.5 ×  Tg CO, 4.4 ×  Tg CO, 7.0 ×  Tg HS, and 6.8 ×  Tg SO. The data support a popular notion that the end-Permian mass extinction on the Earth was caused by the emission of enormous amounts of volatiles from the Siberian Traps into the atmosphere.

In addition, these volcanic eruptions released significant quantities of toxic mercury into the atmosphere and ocean, further contributing to large scale die-offs of terrestrial and marine life. A series of surges in mercury emissions raised environmental mercury concentrations to levels orders of magnitude above normal background levels and caused intervals of extreme environmental toxicity, each lasting for over a thousand years, in both terrestrial and marine ecosystems. Nickel aerosols released by volcanic activity further contributed to metal poisoning. Cobalt and arsenic emissions from the Siberian Traps caused further still environmental stress.

Choiyoi Silicic Large Igneous Province
A second flood basalt event that emplaced what is now known as the Choiyoi Silicic Large Igneous Province in southwestern Gondwana between around 286 Ma and 247 Ma has also been suggested as a possible extinction mechanism. Being about 1,300,000 cubic kilometres in volume and 1,680,000 square kilometres in area, this flood basalt event was approximately 40% the size of the Siberian Traps and thus may have been a significant additional factor explaining the severity of the end-Permian extinction.

Methane clathrate gasification 

Methane clathrates, also known as methane hydrates, consist of methane molecules trapped in cages of water molecules. The methane, produced by methanogens (microscopic single-celled organisms), has a  about 6.0% below normal ( −6.0%). At the right combination of pressure and temperature, the methane is trapped in clathrates fairly close to the surface of permafrost and, in much larger quantities, on continental shelves and the deeper seabed close to them.

This is the first, largest, and most rapid of a series of negative and positive excursions (decreases and increases in ) that continues until the isotope ratio abruptly stabilised in the middle Triassic, followed soon afterwards by the recovery of calcifying life forms (organisms that use calcium carbonate to build hard parts such as shells). While a variety of factors may have contributed to this drop in the  a 2002 review found most of them to be insufficient to account fully for the observed amount:
 Gases from volcanic eruptions have a  about 0.5 to 0.8% below standard ( about −0.5 to −0.8%), but an assessment made in 1995 concluded that the amount required to produce a reduction of about 1.0% worldwide requires eruptions greater by orders of magnitude than any for which evidence has been found. (However, this analysis addressed only CO2 produced by the magma itself, not from interactions with carbon bearing sediments, as later proposed.)
 Buried sedimentary organic matter has a  2.0 to 2.5% below normal ( −2.0 to −2.5%). Theoretically, if the sea level fell sharply, shallow marine sediments would be exposed to oxidation. Moreover, sea levels were rising rather than falling at the time of the extinction.
 Rather than a sudden decline in sea level, intermittent periods of ocean-bottom hyperoxia and anoxia (high-oxygen and low- or zero-oxygen conditions) may have caused the  fluctuations in the Early Triassic; and global anoxia may have been responsible for the end-Permian blip. The continents of the end-Permian and early Triassic were more clustered in the tropics than they are now, and large tropical rivers would have dumped sediment into smaller, partially enclosed ocean basins at low latitudes. Such conditions favor oxic and anoxic episodes; oxic/anoxic conditions would result in a rapid release/burial, respectively, of large amounts of organic carbon, which has a low  because biochemical processes use the lighter isotopes more. That or another organic-based reason may have been responsible for both that and a late Proterozoic/Cambrian pattern of fluctuating 

Other hypotheses include mass oceanic poisoning, releasing vast amounts of CO, and a long-term reorganisation of the global carbon cycle.

Carbon-cycle models confirm that it would have had enough effect to produce the observed reduction. It was also suggested that a large-scale release of methane and other greenhouse gases from the ocean into the atmosphere was connected to the anoxic events and euxinic (i.e. sulfidic) events at the time, with the exact mechanism compared to the 1986 Lake Nyos disaster   

The area covered by lava from the Siberian Traps eruptions is about twice as large as was originally thought, and most of the additional area was shallow sea at the time. The seabed probably contained methane hydrate deposits, and the lava caused the deposits to dissociate, releasing vast quantities of methane.
A vast release of methane might cause significant global warming since methane is a very powerful greenhouse gas. Strong evidence suggests the global temperatures increased by about 6 °C (10.8 °F) near the equator and therefore by more at higher latitudes: a sharp decrease in oxygen isotope ratios; the extinction of Glossopteris flora (Glossopteris and plants that grew in the same areas), which needed a cold climate, with its replacement by floras typical of lower paleolatitudes.

However, the pattern of isotope shifts expected to result from a massive release of methane does not match the patterns seen throughout the Early Triassic. The latest research suggests that greenhouse gas release during the extinction event was dominated by volcanic carbon dioxide, and while methane release had to have contributed, isotopic signatures show that thermogenic methane released from the Siberian Traps had consistently played a larger role than methane from clathrates and any other biogenic sources such as wetlands during the event.

Hypercapnia and acidification 
In marine organisms, relatively modest but sustained increases in  concentrations hamper the synthesis of proteins, reduce fertilization rates, and produce deformities in calcareous hard parts. An analysis of marine fossils from the Permian's final Changhsingian stage found that marine organisms with a low tolerance for hypercapnia (high concentration of carbon dioxide) had high extinction rates, and the most tolerant organisms had very slight losses. The most vulnerable marine organisms were those that produced calcareous hard parts (from calcium carbonate) and had low metabolic rates and weak respiratory systems, notably calcareous sponges, rugose and tabulate corals, calcite-depositing brachiopods, bryozoans, and echinoderms; about 81% of such genera became extinct. Close relatives without calcareous hard parts suffered only minor losses, such as sea anemones, from which modern corals evolved. Animals with high metabolic rates, well-developed respiratory systems, and non-calcareous hard parts had negligible losses except for conodonts, in which 33% of genera died out. This pattern is also consistent with what is known about the effects of hypoxia, a shortage but not total absence of oxygen. However, hypoxia cannot have been the only killing mechanism for marine organisms. Nearly all of the continental shelf waters would have had to become severely hypoxic to account for the magnitude of the extinction, but such a catastrophe would make it difficult to explain the very selective pattern of the extinction. Mathematical models of the Late Permian and Early Triassic atmospheres show a significant but protracted decline in atmospheric oxygen levels, with no acceleration near the P–Tr boundary. Minimum atmospheric oxygen levels in the Early Triassic are never less than present-day levels and so the decline in oxygen levels does not match the temporal pattern of the extinction.

In addition, an increase in  concentration is inevitably linked to ocean acidification, consistent with the preferential extinction of heavily calcified taxa and other signals in the rock record that suggest a more acidic ocean. The decrease in ocean pH is calculated to be up to 0.7 units. Ocean acidification was most extreme at mid-latitudes, and the major marine transgression associated with the end-Permian extinction is believed to have devastated shallow shelf communities in conjunction with anoxia. Evidence from paralic facies spanning the Permian-Triassic boundary in western Guizhou and eastern Yunnan, however, shows a local marine transgression dominated by carbonate deposition, suggesting that ocean acidification did not occur across the entire globe and was likely limited to certain regions of the world's oceans.

On land, the increasing acidification of rainwater caused increased soil erosion as a result of the increased acidity of forest soils, evidenced by the increased influx of terrestrially derived organic sediments found in marine sedimentary deposits during the end-Permian extinction. A positive feedback loop further enhancing and prolonging soil acidification may have resulted from the decline of infaunal invertebrates like tubificids and chironomids, which remove acid metabolites from the soil. The increased abundance of vermiculitic clays in Shansi, South China coinciding with the Permian-Triassic boundary strongly suggests a sharp drop in soil pH causally related to volcanogenic emissions of carbon dioxide and sulphur dioxide.

Anoxia and euxinia 

Evidence for widespread ocean anoxia (severe deficiency of oxygen) and euxinia (presence of hydrogen sulfide) is found from the Late Permian to the Early Triassic. Throughout most of the Tethys and Panthalassic Oceans, evidence for anoxia, including fine laminations in sediments, small pyrite framboids, high uranium/thorium ratios, and biomarkers for green sulfur bacteria, appear at the extinction event. However, evidence for anoxia precedes the extinction at some other sites, including Spiti, India, Meishan, China, Opal Creek, Alberta, and Kap Stosch, Greenland. Biomarkers for green sulfur bacteria, such as isorenieratane, the diagenetic product of isorenieratene, are widely used as indicators of photic zone euxinia because green sulfur bacteria require both sunlight and hydrogen sulfide to survive. Their abundance in sediments from the P–T boundary indicates euxinic conditions were present even in the shallow waters of the photic zone. The disproportionate extinction of high-latitude marine species provides further evidence for oxygen depletion as a killing mechanism; low-latitude species living in warmer, less oxygenated waters are naturally better adapted to lower levels of oxygen and are able to migrate to higher latitudes during periods of global warming, whereas high-latitude organisms are unable to escape from warming, hypoxic waters at the poles.

This spread of toxic, oxygen-depleted water would have devastated marine life, causing widespread die-offs. Models of ocean chemistry suggest that anoxia and euxinia were closely associated with hypercapnia (high levels of carbon dioxide). This suggests that poisoning from hydrogen sulfide, anoxia, and hypercapnia acted together as a killing mechanism. Hypercapnia best explains the selectivity of the extinction, but anoxia and euxinia probably contributed to the high mortality of the event. The persistence of anoxia through the Early Triassic may explain the slow recovery of marine life and low levels of biodiversity after the extinction. Models also show that anoxic events can cause catastrophic hydrogen sulfide emissions into the atmosphere (see below).

The sequence of events leading to anoxic oceans may have been triggered by carbon dioxide emissions from the eruption of the Siberian Traps. In that scenario, warming from the enhanced greenhouse effect would reduce the solubility of oxygen in seawater, causing the concentration of oxygen to decline. Increased weathering of the continents due to warming and the acceleration of the water cycle would increase the riverine flux of phosphate to the ocean. The phosphate would have supported greater primary productivity in the surface oceans. The increase in organic matter production would have caused more organic matter to sink into the deep ocean, where its respiration would further decrease oxygen concentrations. Once anoxia became established, it would have been sustained by a positive feedback loop because deep water anoxia tends to increase the recycling efficiency of phosphate, leading to even higher productivity.

A severe anoxic event at the end of the Permian would have allowed sulfate-reducing bacteria to thrive, causing the production of large amounts of hydrogen sulfide in the anoxic ocean, turning it euxinic. Upwelling of this water may have released massive hydrogen sulfide emissions into the atmosphere and would poison terrestrial plants and animals and severely weaken the ozone layer, exposing much of the life that remained to fatal levels of UV radiation.
Indeed, biomarker evidence for anaerobic photosynthesis by Chlorobiaceae (green sulfur bacteria) from the Late-Permian into the Early Triassic indicates that hydrogen sulfide did upwell into shallow waters because these bacteria are restricted to the photic zone and use sulfide as an electron donor. The hypothesis has the advantage of explaining the mass extinction of plants, which would have added to the methane levels and should otherwise have thrived in an atmosphere with a high level of carbon dioxide. Fossil spores from the end-Permian further support the theory; many spores show deformities that could have been caused by ultraviolet radiation, which would have been more intense after hydrogen sulfide emissions weakened the ozone layer. Fossilised plants from the time of the extinction event show an increase in ultraviolet B absorbing compounds, confirming that increased ultraviolet radiation played a role in the environmental catastrophe.

Some scientists have challenged the anoxia hypothesis on the grounds that long-lasting anoxic conditions could not have been supported if Late Permian thermohaline ocean circulation conformed to the "thermal mode" characterised by cooling at high latitudes. Anoxia may have persisted under a "haline mode" in which circulation was driven by subtropical evaporation, although the "haline mode" is highly unstable and was unlikely to have represented Late Permian oceanic circulation.

Oxygen depletion via extensive microbial blooms also played a role in the biological collapse of not just marine ecosystems but freshwater ones as well. Persistent lack of oxygen after the extinction event itself helped delay biotic recovery for much of the Early Triassic epoch.

Aridification 
Analysis of the fossil river deposits of the floodplains indicate a shift from meandering to braided river patterns, indicating a very abrupt drying of the climate. The climate change may have taken as little as 100,000 years, prompting the extinction of the unique Glossopteris flora and its associated herbivores, followed by the carnivorous guild. In the North China Basin, highly arid climatic conditions are recorded during the latest Permian, near the Permian-Triassic boundary, with a swing towards increased precipitation during the Early Triassic, the latter likely assisting biotic recovery following the mass extinction.

Evidence from the Sydney Basin of eastern Australia, on the other hand, suggests that the expansion of semi-arid and arid climatic belts across Pangaea was not immediate but was instead a gradual, prolonged process. Apart from the disappearance of peatlands, there was little evidence of significant sedimentological changes in depositional style across the Permian-Triassic boundary. Instead, a modest shift to amplified seasonality and hotter summers is suggested by palaeoclimatological models based on weathering proxies from the region's Late Permian and Early Triassic deposits.

In the Kuznetsk Basin of southwestern Siberia, an increase in aridity led to the demise of the humid-adapted cordaites forests in the region a few hundred thousand years before the Permian-Triassic boundary. This has been attributed to a broader poleward shift of drier, more arid climates during the late Changhsingian before the more abrupt main phase of the extinction at the Permian-Triassic boundary that disproportionately affected tropical and subtropical species.

Asteroid impact 

Evidence that an impact event may have caused the Cretaceous–Paleogene extinction has led to speculation that similar impacts may have been the cause of other extinction events, including the P–Tr extinction, and thus to a search for evidence of impacts at the times of other extinctions, such as large impact craters of the appropriate age.

Reported evidence for an impact event from the P–Tr boundary level includes rare grains of shocked quartz in Australia and Antarctica; fullerenes trapping extraterrestrial noble gases; meteorite fragments in Antarctica; and grains rich in iron, nickel, and silicon, which may have been created by an impact. However, the accuracy of most of these claims has been challenged. For example, quartz from Graphite Peak in Antarctica, once considered "shocked", has been re-examined by optical and transmission electron microscopy. The observed features were concluded to be due not to shock, but rather to plastic deformation, consistent with formation in a tectonic environment such as volcanism.

An impact crater on the seafloor would be evidence of a possible cause of the P–Tr extinction, but such a crater would by now have disappeared. As 70% of the Earth's surface is currently sea, an asteroid or comet fragment is now perhaps more than twice as likely to hit the ocean as it is to hit land. However, Earth's oldest ocean-floor crust is only 200 million years old as it is continually being destroyed and renewed by spreading and subduction. Furthermore, craters produced by very large impacts may be masked by extensive flood basalting from below after the crust is punctured or weakened. Yet, subduction should not be entirely accepted as an explanation for the lack of evidence: as with the K-T event, an ejecta blanket stratum rich in siderophilic elements (such as iridium) would be expected in formations from the time.

A large impact might have triggered other mechanisms of extinction described above, such as the Siberian Traps eruptions at either an impact site or the antipode of an impact site. The abruptness of an impact also explains why more species did not rapidly evolve to survive, as would be expected if the Permian–Triassic event had been slower and less global than a meteorite impact.

Bolide impact claims have been criticised on the grounds that they are unnecessary as explanations for the extinctions, and they do not fit the known data compatible with a protracted extinction spanning thousands of years.

Possible impact sites 
Possible impact craters proposed as the site of an impact causing the P–Tr extinction include the  Bedout structure off the northwest coast of Australia and the hypothesized  Wilkes Land crater of East Antarctica. An impact has not been proved in either case, and the idea has been widely criticized. The Wilkes Land geophysical feature is of very uncertain age, possibly later than the Permian–Triassic extinction.

The impact occurred around extensive deposits of oil shale in the shallow marine Paraná–Karoo Basin, whose perturbation by the seismicity resulting from impact likely discharged about 1.6 teratonnes of methane into Earth's atmosphere, buttressing the already rapid warming caused by hydrocarbon release due to the Siberian Traps. The large earthquakes generated by the impact would have additionally generated massive tsunamis across much of the globe. Despite this, most palaeontologists reject the impact as being a significant driver of the extinction, citing the relatively low energy (equivalent to 105 to 106 of TNT, around two orders of magnitude lower than the impact energy believed to be required to induce mass extinctions) released by the impact.

Estimates for the age of the structure range up to 250 million years old. This would be substantially larger than the well-known  Chicxulub impact crater associated with a later extinction. However, Dave McCarthy and colleagues from the British Geological Survey illustrated that the gravity anomaly is not circular and also that the seismic data presented by Rocca, Rampino and Baez Presser did not cross the proposed crater or provide any evidence for an impact crater.

Methanogenic microbes 
A hypothesis published in 2014 posits that a genus of anaerobic methanogenic archaea known as Methanosarcina was responsible for the event. Three lines of evidence suggest that these microbes acquired a new metabolic pathway via gene transfer at about that time, enabling them to efficiently metabolize acetate into methane. That would have led to their exponential reproduction, allowing them to rapidly consume vast deposits of organic carbon that had accumulated in the marine sediment. The result would have been a sharp buildup of methane and carbon dioxide in the Earth's oceans and atmosphere, in a manner that may be consistent with the 13C/12C isotopic record. Massive volcanism facilitated this process by releasing large amounts of nickel, a scarce metal which is a cofactor for enzymes involved in producing methane. On the other hand, in the canonical Meishan sections, the nickel concentration increases somewhat after the  concentrations have begun to fall.

Supercontinent Pangaea 

In the mid-Permian (during the Kungurian age of the Permian's Cisuralian epoch), Earth's major continental plates joined, forming a supercontinent called Pangaea, which was surrounded by the superocean, Panthalassa.

Oceanic circulation and atmospheric weather patterns during the mid-Permian produced seasonal monsoons near the coasts and an arid climate in the vast continental interior.

As the supercontinent formed, the ecologically diverse and productive coastal areas shrank. The shallow aquatic environments were eliminated and exposed formerly protected organisms of the rich continental shelves to increased environmental volatility.

Pangaea's formation depleted marine life at near catastrophic rates. However, Pangaea's effect on land extinctions is thought to have been smaller. In fact, the advance of the therapsids and increase in their diversity is attributed to the late Permian, when Pangaea's global effect was thought to have peaked.

While Pangaea's formation certainly initiated a long period of marine extinction, its impact on the "Great Dying" and the end of the Permian is uncertain.

Interstellar dust 
John Gribbin argues that the Solar System last passed through a spiral arm of the Milky Way around 250 million years ago and that the resultant dusty gas clouds may have caused a dimming of the Sun, which combined with the effect of Pangaea to produce an ice age.

Combination of causes 
Possible causes supported by strong evidence appear to describe a sequence of catastrophes, each worse than the last: the Siberian Traps eruptions were bad enough alone, but because they occurred near coal beds and the continental shelf, they also triggered very large releases of carbon dioxide and methane. The resultant global warming may have caused perhaps the most severe anoxic event in the oceans' history: according to this theory, the oceans became so anoxic, anaerobic sulfur-reducing organisms dominated the chemistry of the oceans and caused massive emissions of toxic hydrogen sulfide.

However, there may be some weak links in this chain of events: the changes in the 13C/12C ratio expected to result from a massive release of methane do not match the patterns seen throughout the early Triassic; and the types of oceanic thermohaline circulation that may have existed at the end of the Permian are not likely to have supported deep-sea anoxia.

See also

 Carbon dioxide
 Extinction event
 Climate change
 List of possible impact structures on Earth
 Silurian hypothesis

References

Further reading 
 
 
  (editor), Understanding Late Devonian and Permian–Triassic Biotic and Climatic Events (Volume 20 in series Developments in Palaeontology and Stratigraphy (2006)). The state of the inquiry into the extinction events.
  (editor), Permo–Triassic Events in the Eastern Tethys : Stratigraphy Classification and Relations with the Western Tethys (in series World and Regional Geology)

External links 
 
 
 
 
 
 
  Podcast available.

 
.
.
Events that forced the climate
Extinction events
Hypothetical impact events
Meteorological hypotheses
Permian events
Permian life
Triassic events
Triassic life